The Conversations at Curlow Creek is a historical novel written by the prominent Australian author David Malouf. It was first published in 1996 by the Random House publishing group.

Plot summary

The story takes place in 1827 on an isolated farm at the fictional locality of Curlow Creek in the mountains of the colony of New South Wales. The two main characters are Michael Adair, an Irish-born officer in the colonial mounted troopers, and Daniel Carney, an Irish escapee and bushranger. Adair had been dispatched from Sydney to oversee Carney's hanging and he arrives at Carney's temporary prison—a stockman's hut—on the night before he is due to be executed.

The narrative details conversations held by Adair and Carney throughout the cold night as they explore their shared Irish heritage. The novel is also peppered with Adair's reminiscences of his aristocratic childhood in County Galway. As the plot progresses, Adair develops sympathy for Carney despite his criminal past and impoverished background. The novel ends with Adair presumed to have let Carney escape into the bush—though as with many of David Malouf's novels, the ending is ambiguous and the reader does not know for sure the fate of the hero.

Notes
Dedication: "To Peter Straus."

Awards
The Age Book of the Year Award, Fiction Prize, 1996: shortlisted 
Miles Franklin Award 1997: shortlisted

1996 Australian novels
Novels by David Malouf
Australian historical novels
Fiction set in 1827
Novels set in New South Wales
Novels set in Ireland
Chatto & Windus books
County Galway